Mathur is a village in the Kumbakonam taluk, Thiruvidaimarudur block of Thanjavur district, Tamil Nadu, India.

Demographics 

As per the 2001 census, Mathur had a total population of 2376 with 1191 males and 1185 females. The sex ratio was 995. The literacy rate was 75.84

References 

 

Villages in Thanjavur district